Malcolm Fleming may refer to:

 Malcolm Fleming, Earl of Wigtown (died 1363)
 Malcolm Fleming, 1st Lord Fleming (c. 1437–1477)
 Malcolm Fleming, 3rd Lord Fleming (died 1547)

See also
Malcolm Flemyng (died 1764), writer